Berta Johanna Amalie Bock née Spech (15 March 1857 – 4 April 1945) was a Romanian composer. She was born in Hermannstadt, Transylvania (now Sibiu, Romania) and also taught piano and voice. She died in Sibiu.

Works
Brock composed an opera, several ballets and songs for voice and piano.
Selected works include:
 Die Pfingstkrone, opera
 Die alte Linde, op. 10 no. 4 (Text: Anna Schullerus)
 Ich sah im Felde, op. 12 no. 5 (Text: R. Kandt)
 Noch bin ich jung, op. 6 no. 3 (Text: Helene Tiedemann)
 Über den Bergen, op. 9 no. 1 (Text: Karl (or Carl) Busse)
 Vor der Schmiede, op. 7 no. 1 (Text: Reinhard Volker)

References

1857 births
1945 deaths
19th-century classical composers
20th-century classical composers
Romanian music educators
Voice teachers
Piano pedagogues
Women classical composers
Romanian classical composers
Musicians from Sibiu
Transylvanian Saxon people
Women music educators
20th-century women composers
19th-century women composers